Clarkson Brazelton (April 11, 1892 – June 14, 1940) was an American Negro league catcher in the 1910s.

A native of Asheville, North Carolina, Brazelton made his Negro leagues debut in 1915 with the Chicago Giants. He played for the Chicago American Giants the following season, and also played in the Cuban League for the San Francisco Park club. Brazelton died in Chicago, Illinois in 1940 at age 48.

References

External links
 and Seamheads

1892 births
1940 deaths
Chicago American Giants players
Chicago Giants players
San Francisco Park players
American expatriate baseball players in Cuba
20th-century African-American sportspeople